Anton Yevgenyevich Zhukov (born 27 August 1968) is a former Russian football player.

References

1968 births
Living people
Soviet footballers
FC Spartak Kostroma players
Russian footballers
FC Shinnik Yaroslavl players
Russian Premier League players
FC Torpedo Miass players
Association football defenders
FC Nosta Novotroitsk players